3SL were a Welsh pop group made up of brothers Steve (born 5 January 1979), Anthony "Ant" (born 26 October 1983), and Andy Scott-Lee (born 29 March 1980). Originally from Rhyl in North Wales, they were managed by their elder sister Lisa, a member of the pop group Steps. The group's first single, "Take It Easy", reached No. 11 on the UK Singles Chart in April 2002. Their follow-up single, a cover of Case's "Touch Me, Tease Me", was less successful, reaching number 16, and the band was subsequently dropped by their record label, Sony, leaving their self-titled debut album unreleased. The group later toured the country with S Club 7 as part of their S Club Carnival tour, and band member Andy Scott-Lee later appeared on the second series of the ITV talent show Pop Idol, placing seventh.

Discography

Singles
 "Take It Easy" (April 2002) - UK No. 11
 "Touch Me, Tease Me" (October 2002) - No. 16

References

Sibling musical trios
Welsh boy bands
Musical groups established in 2002
Musical groups disestablished in 2002
Welsh pop music groups
2002 establishments in Wales
Sony Music UK artists